Glomerulosclerosis is the hardening of the glomeruli in the kidney. It is a general term to describe scarring of the kidneys' tiny blood vessels, the glomeruli, the functional units in the kidney that filter urea from the blood.

Proteinuria (large amounts of protein in the urine) is one of the signs of glomerulosclerosis. Scarring disturbs the filtering process of the kidneys and allows protein to leak from the blood into the urine. However, glomerulosclerosis is one of many causes of proteinuria. A kidney biopsy (the removal of a tiny part of the kidney with a needle) may be necessary to determine whether a patient has glomerulosclerosis or another kidney problem. About 15 percent of people with proteinuria turn out to have glomerulosclerosis.

Both children and adults can develop glomerulosclerosis, which can result in different types of kidney conditions. One frequently encountered type of glomerulosclerosis is caused by diabetes. Drug use or infections may cause focal segmental glomerulosclerosis (FSGS), a very chronic kidney condition. FSGS may also occur in patients with AIDS, but most cases are of unknown cause.

Types
More specifically, glomerulosclerosis can refer to:
 Focal segmental glomerulosclerosis
 Nodular glomerulosclerosis (diabetic)

Diagnosis
Early stages of glomerulosclerosis may not produce any symptoms, but the most important warning sign is proteinuria, usually discovered in routine medical exams. Losing large amounts of protein may cause swelling in the ankles and an accumulation of fluid in the abdomen.

Scarred glomeruli cannot be repaired, and many patients with glomerulosclerosis get worse over time until their kidneys fail. This condition is called end-stage renal disease (ESRD), and the patients must begin dialysis treatment or receive a kidney transplant. ESRD may be reached within a year or up to ten years or more after the diagnosis of glomerulosclerosis, but times may vary.

Treatment
Treatments for glomerulosclerosis depend on what caused the scarring of the glomeruli. This is determined by a renal biopsy. Immunosuppressive drugs stop proteinuria in some patients, but once the treatments have ended, proteinuria will continue. The drugs may sometimes damage the patient's kidneys even more.

Controlling the patient's blood pressure may control the progression of kidney failure. ACE inhibitors, a type of blood pressure medicine, preserve kidney function in patients with diabetes. ACE inhibitors may also slow down kidney failure in patients without diabetes. Low-protein diets may also lessen the work done by the kidneys to process waste. Some patients will need to control their cholesterol through diet or both diet and medicine.

See also
 BK virus
 Epstein–Barr virus infection

References
 Glomerulosclerosis--WebMD

External links 

Glomerular diseases